Disney Junior is a British-managed Portuguese pay television channel owned and operated by The Walt Disney Company Limited. Aimed mainly at children between 2 and 7 years of age, it replaced the Disney Cinemagic channel on 1 November 2012. Along with the new channel, Disney launched "Disney Movies On Demand" service on ZON.

On March 2021, an HD feed was launched on the TV operator MEO.

References

Television stations in Portugal
Television channels and stations established in 2012
2012 establishments in Portugal
Portugal